Henry Joseph Grayson (9 May 1856 – 21 March 1918) was a British-born Australian nurseryman and scientist, best known as the designer of a machine for ruling diffraction gratings.

Grayson was born in Worrall, near Sheffield, Yorkshire, England, son of Joseph Grayson, a Master Cutler, and his wife Fanny, née Smith. Grayson came of a family of market gardeners, and travelled to New Zealand in the early 1880s. After he returned to England and married Elizabeth Clare on 11 August 1886, the couple soon migrated to Victoria (Australia) where Grayson worked as a nursery gardener. Becoming interested in science he joined the Field Naturalists Club of Victoria, studied botany and did some work on the diatoms, a group of minute plants. Grayson attended meetings of the Royal Microscopical Society and developed a talent for preparing microscope slides. Before 1894 he had constructed a machine for making micrometer rulings on glass, the results being very good for that time. In 1897 some beautiful work Grayson had done in cutting sections of plants led to his being given a position in the physiology department of the University of Melbourne under Professor C. J. Martin.

He was afterwards transferred to the geology department, and in December 1901 accompanied Professor F. T. Gregory on his expedition to Central Australia. In the preface to The Dead Heart of Australia Gregory paid a special tribute "To my assistant Mr Grayson on whom much of the hard work of the expedition fell". In 1910 Grayson was associated with Daniel James Mahony in the preparation of a paper on "The Geology of the Camperdown and Mount Elephant Districts" (No. 9 in the Memoirs of the Geological Survey of Victoria), and in the same year, while working at the university under professor E. W. Skeats, who succeeded Gregory, Grayson made a highly efficient apparatus for preparing rock sections, a description of which will be found in the Proceedings of the Royal Society of Victoria for the year 1911.

In the meanwhile Grayson had been perfecting his fine ruling work. Grayson had by then succeeded in creating 120,000 diffractions lines to the inch (4,700 lines per mm). Grayson described his work on diffraction ruling in a report published for the Report of Meeting, Eighth Meeting of the Australasian Association for the Advancement of Science, held at Melbourne, Victoria in 1900:

 
From this time onwards much of his time was given to the preparation of a dividing engine for ruling diffraction gratings. Grayson was transferred to the Natural Philosophy department of the university under Professor T. R. Lyle in 1913 and was allowed to give his full time to the machine. In July 1917 he read a paper before the Royal Society of Victoria giving a full description of the machine, which was published with several plates in the society's Proceedings for that year. In the same year Grayson was awarded the David Syme Research Prize of £100 by the University of Melbourne. Grayson died in Clyde of heart disease leaving a widow but no children.

References

1856 births
1918 deaths
19th-century Australian inventors
Australian scientists
Australian nurserymen
English emigrants to Australia